To Live Again is a 1963 short documentary film produced by Mel London. It was nominated for an Academy Award for Best Documentary Short.

See also
List of American films of 1963

References

External links

1963 films
1963 documentary films
1963 short films
American short documentary films
1960s short documentary films
1960s English-language films
1960s American films